Alfred Marie Maurice Napoléon François de Paule del Valle (23 April 1883 – 12 September 1965) was a French ice hockey player. He competed in the men's tournament at the 1924 Winter Olympics.

References

1883 births
1965 deaths
Ice hockey people from Paris
Ice hockey players at the 1924 Winter Olympics
Olympic ice hockey players of France